Martin Stankov (born 25 February 1974) is a former Bulgarian professional footballer who played as a defender. He gained 2 caps for the Bulgaria national team.

At club level, Stankov played for Slavia Sofia, Levski Sofia, Malatyaspor and Khazar Lenkoran.

References

1974 births
Bulgarian footballers
Bulgaria international footballers
Living people
PFC Slavia Sofia players
PFC Levski Sofia players
Malatyaspor footballers
Khazar Lankaran FK players
People from Vidin
Bulgarian expatriate footballers
Expatriate footballers in Azerbaijan

Association football defenders
Bulgarian expatriate sportspeople in Azerbaijan